Charles Desborough 'Don' Burnell,  (13 January 1876 – 3 October 1969) was a British rower who competed in the 1908 Summer Olympics.

Biography
Burnell was born at Beckenham, then in Kent. He was educated at Eton College and Magdalen College, Oxford, and was a member of the winning Oxford crews in the Boat Races of 1895, 1896, 1897 and 1898. He became a member of Leander Club and was in the Leander crew which won the Grand Challenge Cup at Henley Royal Regatta for four consecutive years from 1898 to 1901. He was also a three-time winner of the Stewards' Challenge Cup at Henley. In 1908 he was a crew member of the Leander eight, which won the gold medal for Great Britain rowing at the 1908 Summer Olympics.

During World War I. Burnell served as a Lt Colonel in the London Rifle Brigade and won a DSO in 1918. After the war, he rejoined the family firm of stockbrokers in the city. He was Chairman of the Wokingham Rural District Council for 35 years. In 1954 he was awarded the OBE for public service in Berkshire.

He married Jessie Backhouse Hulke in 1903 in Kensington, London. They had four children and their son Richard Burnell was also an Olympic rower, winning a gold medal in 1948 in the double sculls.

Burnell died at Blewbury, Oxfordshire, at the age of 93 on 3 October 1969.

See also
List of Oxford University Boat Race crews

References

External links
profile

1876 births
1969 deaths
People educated at Eton College
Alumni of Magdalen College, Oxford
British male rowers
English male rowers
English Olympic medallists
Olympic rowers of Great Britain
Rowers at the 1908 Summer Olympics
Olympic gold medallists for Great Britain
Stewards of Henley Royal Regatta
Rifle Brigade officers
British Army personnel of World War I
Companions of the Distinguished Service Order
Officers of the Order of the British Empire
Olympic medalists in rowing
Members of Leander Club
Oxford University Boat Club rowers
Medalists at the 1908 Summer Olympics
London Rifle Brigade officers
Military personnel from Kent